This is the list of châteaux, which are located in Champagne-Ardenne, France.

Ardennes 
Château de la Cassine, in Vendresse
Château de Doumely, in Doumely-Bégny
Château de Hierges, in Hierges
Château de Landreville, in Bayonville
Château de Linchamps, in Nohan (commune of Thilay)
Château de Montcornet, in Montcornet
Château de Montvillers, in Bazeilles
Château-Regnault, in Bogny-sur-Meuse)
Château de Sedan, in Sedan

Aube 
Château de Bar-sur-Seine, in Bar-sur-Seine
Château de Bligny, in Bligny
Château de Bouilly, in Bouilly
Château de Bréviandes, in Bréviandes
Château de Brienne, in Brienne-le-Château
Château de Corbeau, in Chacenay
Château de Jaucourt, in Jaucourt
Château de La Motte-Tilly, in La Motte-Tilly
Château de Pont-sur-Seine, in Pont-sur-Seine,
Château de Praslin, in Praslin
Château des Riceys, aux Riceys
Château de Rumilly-lès-Vaudes, in Rumilly-lès-Vaudes
Château de Vendeuvre-sur-Barse, in Vendeuvre-sur-Barse
château de Villehardouin

Haute-Marne 
Château d'Arc-en-Barrois, in Arc-en-Barrois
Château d'Auberive, in Auberive
Château d'Autreville, in Autreville-sur-la-Renne
Château de Chalancey, in Chalancey
Château de Châteauvillain, in Châteauvillain
Château de Cirey, in Cirey-sur-Blaise
Château de Dinteville, in Dinteville
Château d'Ecot, in Ecot-la-Combe.
Château du Grand Jardin, in Joinville
Château de Lafauche, in Lafauche
Château du Pailly, au Pailly
Château de Prauthoy in Prauthoy
Château de Reynel, in Reynel
Château de Vignory, in Vignory
Château de Vroncourt, in Vroncourt-la-Côte

Marne 
Château de Boursault, in Boursault
Château de Dormans, in Dormans
Château d'Épernay, in Épernay
Château de Gueux in Gueux
Château de Louvois, in Louvois
Château de Mareuil, in Mareuil-sur-Ay
Château de la Marquetterie, in Pierry
Château de Merfy, in Merfy
Château de Montmirail, in Montmirail 
Château de Montmort, in Montmort-Lucy
Château Perrier, in Épernay
Château de Placard, in Mœurs-Verdey
Fort de la Pompelle, in Reims
Château de Réveillon, in Réveillon
Château de Serzy-Prin, in Serzy-et-Prin

See also 
 List of castles in France

 Champagne-Ardenne